Somatidia antarctica is a species of beetle in the family Cerambycidae. It was described by White in 1846, originally under the genus Parmena. It feeds on Dacrydium cupressinum.

References

antarctica
Beetles described in 1846